SEC14 and spectrin domains 1, also known as SEC14 domain and spectrin repeat-containing protein 1 and Solo, is a protein that in humans is encoded by the SESTD1 gene.

References

Further reading